Base Léonore, or the Léonore database, is a French database that lists the records of the members of the National Order of the Legion of Honor. The database lists the records of those inducted into the Legion of Honor since its 1802 inception and who died before 1977.

, the database contained 390,000 records.

References

External links

Archives in France
History websites of France
Online databases
Recipients of the Legion of Honour